Stevens Siaka is a Ghanaian politician and member of the Seventh Parliament of the Fourth Republic of Ghana representing the Jaman North constituency in the Bono Region on the ticket of the New Patriotic Party. Siaka Stevens was a former Chairman of the Parliamentary Select Committee on Education and is now the Deputy Minister for Bono Region.

Early life and education 
Siaka was born on 31 December 1964 and hails from Sampa in the Bono Region of Ghana. He had his master's degree in Public Administration and Post Graduate Diploma from GIMPA. He also had his bachelor's degree in Management and Diploma in Accounting and Business Management from the University of Education, Winneba. He also had his Diploma in Accounting and Business Management from the Cambridge Tutorial College in London. He also had his certificate in Commercial Law from the Institute of Management Studies.

Politics 
Siaka is a member of New Patriotic Party. He was the Deputy Regional Minister for Bono Region from 27 March 2019 to January 2021.

References

Ghanaian MPs 2017–2021
1964 births
Living people
New Patriotic Party politicians